Zhou Feng is a freestyle wrestler from China.  She competes in the 75 kg division and won the gold medal in the same division at the 2014 Asian Games.

References

External links
 

Living people
Chinese female sport wrestlers
Wrestlers at the 2016 Summer Olympics
Olympic wrestlers of China
Asian Games gold medalists for China
Wrestlers at the 2014 Asian Games
Asian Games medalists in wrestling
Medalists at the 2014 Asian Games
Wrestlers at the 2018 Asian Games
Medalists at the 2018 Asian Games
World Wrestling Championships medalists
Wrestlers at the 2020 Summer Olympics
1993 births
21st-century Chinese women
20th-century Chinese women